European route E39 is the designation of a  north–south road in Norway and Denmark from Klett, just south of Trondheim, to Aalborg via Bergen, Stavanger and Kristiansand. In total, there are nine ferries, more than any other single road in Europe.

In Trondheim, there are connections to E6 and E14. In Ålesund, to E136, in Bergen to E16, in Haugesund, to E134, in Kristiansand to E18, and in Aalborg to E45.

Norwegian part 

In Norway, E39 is part of the Norwegian national road system, and is as such developed and maintained by the public roads administration. E39 is mostly a two-lane undivided road, and only relatively short sections near Stavanger, Trondheim and Bergen are motorways or semi-motorways.

Trøndelag county 
Trondheim
 
   Klett junction
 Udduvoll bru
Melhus
  Semi-motorway Øysand-Thamshavn/Orkanger (22 km)
  2 Toll stations at Øysand/Buvika and Thamshavn
Skaun
  Skaun
Orkland
   Orkanger
  Lensvik, Fosen
Heim
  ferry from Halsa to Kanestraum in Tingvoll (20 minutes, fee)

Møre og Romsdal county 

Tingvoll
  Bergsøysund Bridge 931 m
Gjemnes
  Gjemnessund Bridge 1257 m

Molde
  ←Molde Airport, Årø  →Eide, Elnesvågen
  → Fannefjordstunnelen direction Åndalsnes
  ferry from Molde to Vestnes (Furnes dock, 35 minutes)
Vestnes
  at Skorgenes, jointly with E39 until Spjelkavika
Ålesund
  Sjøholt → Linge ferry dock
  at Spjelkavika, jointly with E39 from Skorgenes at Tresfjord
  Vegsundbrua

Sula
  ferry from Solavågen to Festøya in Ørsta (20 minutes, fee)
Ørsta
   Ørsta
Volda
   Furene →  Eiksund tunnel
  to  Volda-Folkestad
 Rotsethorntunnelen 
 Årsettunnelen 
 Fyrdsbergtunnelen
 Damfosstunnelen 
 Eidsnakktunnelen 
 Kviven Tunnel 
  to Hellesylt and Stranda

Vestland county 

Stad
  at Leivdøla bridge, jointly with E39 until Nordfjordeid
  to  Folkestad-Volda
   at Nordfjordeid to Måløy
Gloppen
  Ferry from Lote to Anda (10 min, 1–2 departures per hour, fee)

  at Sandane
  Breimsfjelltunnelen 2 
  Breimsfjelltunnelen 1 
  at Byrkjelo
Sunnfjord
  jointly with E39 from Skei to Førde
  at Moskog to Balestrand over Gaularfjellet
  Toll into Førde
  to Førde hospital
  Førde
  Toll into Førde
  to Askvoll
  at Espeland to  Førde airport
  at Sande to Dale and Askvoll westbound or to Gaularfjellet eastbound
  Økslandtunnelen 
Høyanger
  at Vadheim
  Bogstunnelen 
  Noreviktunnelen 
 Lavik
  ferry from Lavik to Ytre Oppedal (20 min, 1–2 departures per hour, fee)
Gulen
 Ytre Oppedal
  Skrikebergtunnelen 
  Jernfjelltunnelen 
Masfjorden
  Matreberg Tunnel 
  Masfjord Tunnel 
Alver
  Eikefet Tunnel 
  Mundalsberget
  Mundalsberg Tunnel 
  at Knarvik
  Hagelsund Bridge 

  Flatøy
  to Flatøy and Holsnøy
  Nordhordland Bridge (Nordhordlandsbrua) 

Bergen
  at Nyborg
  Motorway Vågsbotn – Eidsvåg (5 km)
  Fløyfjellstunnelen (two parallel tunnels, 3195 and 3825 m)
 Bergen
  3 Toll stations at Sandviken, Nygårdsbroen and Fjøsangerveien
  to  Bergen Airport, Flesland
Bjørnafjorden
  Ferry from Halhjem to Sandvikvåg (40 min, 2 departures per hour, fee)
Fitjar
  to Fitjar
Stord
  at Jektevik
  Stordabrua/Stord Bridge (1076 m)
  Bømlafjordtunnelen/Bømlafjord Tunnel (7888 m, 262 m below s.l.)
Sveio

Rogaland county 
Tysvær
  At Aksdal
Bokn
  Ferry from Arsvågen to Mortavika
Stavanger
  Mastrafjordtunnelen (4424 m)
  Byfjordtunnelen (5875 m)
Randaberg
Stavanger
  2 Toll stations at Randabergveien and Forus
  Motorway Schancheholen–Sandved (12 km)
  Stavanger Airport, Sola
Sandnes
Gjesdal
Bjerkreim
Eigersund
Lund

Agder County 

Flekkefjord
Kvinesdal
  Fedafjorden Bridge
  Vatlandtunnelen (3184 m)
Lyngdal
  Toll Handeland in Lyngdal
Lindesnes
  Kirkeheitunnelen (835 m)
 Kristiansand
  Toll Vesterveien in Kristiansand
  At Kristiansand
  Hirtshals, Denmark (2–3 hours, 2–5 departures/day, fee)

Domestic ferries 
The E39 ferries are operated by Fjord1 except the Volda-Folkestad and Festøya-Solavågen ferry, which are operated by Norled.

Domestic car ferries on the E39 are regarded as an integral part of national highways. Ferries operate according to a published timetable and standard prices for vehicles and passengers.  The E39 includes the following ferry routes from North to South (approximate crossing time in minutes):

Halsa–Kanestraum 20 min.
Molde–Vestnes 35 min.
Solavågen–Festøya 20 min.

Anda–Lote 10 min.
Lavik–Oppedal 20 min.
Halhjem–Sandvikvåg 45 min.
Arsvågen–Mortavika 25 min.

The Norwegian government plans to replace all the ferries on E39 in Norway with bridges and tunnels. This involves some of the longest proposed bridge spans.

History 
In 1786, a royal decision was made to establish a postal route between Bergen and Trondheim. From the establishment of mail in Norway in 1647 until then, all mail between those cities went over to Oslo. To begin with, the route was for large parts usable for walking and horse riding only, but in the following decades it was rebuilt to allow horse carriages. Several parts required boat. The route was Bergen–Åsane–Hordvik–(boat over Salhusfjorden)–Isdal–Hundvin–Gulen–Rutledal–(boat over Sognefjorden)–Leirvik (Hyllestad)–Flekke–Dale–Bygstad–Førde–Jølster–Gloppen-(boat over Nordfjord)–Faleide (Stryn)–Hornindal–Hellesylt–Stranda–(boat along Storfjorden)–Sjøholt–Vestnes-(boat over Romsdalsfjorden)–Molde–Angvik–(boat over Tingvollfjorden)–Tingvoll–(boat over Halsafjord)–Stangvik–Skei–Rindal–Orkanger–Trondheim. The 1786 decision also included a mail route between Stavanger and Bergen.
In 1858, mail was rerouted to newly established steam ships Bergen–Vadheim, and the mail route changed to Vadheim–Sande–Førde, in parts precisely along today's route.

Since 1990, a number of long bridges and tunnels have replaced four of the ferries. The bridges and tunnels are:
Nordhordland Bridge (1994)
Gjemnessund Bridge and Bergsøysund Bridge (1992)
Stord Bridge and Bømlafjord Tunnel (2000)
Kviven Tunnel and further tunnels (2012)
Other large road projects include:
Klett–Orkanger (2005)
Orkanger–Høgkjølen (2015)
Lote Tunnel (1966)
Bogs Tunnel (2004) and the adjacent Norevik Tunnel (2012)
Masfjord Tunnel and adjacent tunnels (1986–1995)
Eikefet Tunnel (1980)
Fløyfjell Tunnel (1989)
Mastrafjord Tunnel (1982)

The route Trondheim–Ålesund–Bergen–Stavanger–Kristiansand was named E39 in 2000. Kristiansund–Stavanger was earlier riksveg 1 (national highway 1, "coastal through-road") from 1992 and riksveg 14 before 1992. Stavanger–Kristiansand was part of E18, and Trondheim – Kristiansund was riksveg 65 and riksveg 71.

Future 
A  motorway south of Bergen is under construction and expected to be finished in 2022.
The entire route from Stavanger to Kristiansand is planned to be rebuilt into 4 lane motorway before 2030, in total  remaining (as of 2021) to be built.
There are plans to replace every ferry link with a fixed connection. There are seven, but each presents a costly technical challenge as the fjords are wide and very deep, and have met public resistance.Apart from Rogfast, two projects have a time plan, although delayed:
Hordfast (south of Bergen) is prioritised because of having the highest number of ferry ships, five in operation, and second-most vehicle traffic after Rogfast. It is prioritised despite being probably the most technically challenging of all these crossings. A five kilometre long floating bridge over Bjørnafjorden is planned, a new world record, in a stormy area, with clearing for ship traffic below. And a suspension bridge over Langenuen with  span, one of the longest in the world. The total cost for Hordfast is estimated to 37 billion NOK ($US  billion) in part paid by road tolls of around 400 NOK. Regulatory standards will be completed in 2023, and it is estimated to be completed in the 2030s.
Construction start is planned for around 2030.
The remaining four fjord crossings are more unsure, but are being investigated.
Sognefjorden: a 4 km long floating bridge is considered.
Nordfjorden: a 1.8 km long suspension bridge with a 1.5 km span is considered.
Sulafjorden and Vartdalsfjorden: a 4 km long floating bridge plus a 2 km long suspension bridge is considered.
Halsafjorden: a 3 km long floating bridge is considered.

Norway–Denmark ferry 
An international car ferry is operated by Color Line and by Fjord Line (seasonally).
Kristiansand – Hirtshals 3 hours 15 minutes

Danish part 

From Norway, E39 goes with ferry from Kristiansand to Hirtshals, in northern Denmark. Ferries are run by Color Line and Fjord Line.
The motorway goes from the south of Hirtshals to the north of Aalborg.
The exits are:
  Aabyen
  2 Hjørring N
  3 Hjørring C
  4 Hjørring S
  5 Vrå
  6 Brønderslev C
  7 Brønderslev S
 | Store Vildmose
  8 Tylstrup
  9 Vestbjerg
  10 Høvejen → Aalborg Airport
   Aalborg, Aarhus

References

External links 
 UN Economic Commission for Europe: Overall Map of E-road Network (2007)
 European route E39

39
E039
E039
E039
Roads in Trøndelag
Roads in Møre og Romsdal
Roads in Vestland
Roads in Rogaland
Roads in Agder